The International Bebras Challenge on Informatics is an annual computer science competition for primary and secondary school students around the world. With 54 member countries and more than 2.5 million participating students in 2021, the competition is the largest computer science competition in the world.

Format
The Bebras is a 45-minute multiple-choice test with 15 problems. The problems are divided into three pairs of 5, and classified as "easy", "medium" and "hard". In most countries, the competition is administered through a web system that automatically scores each participant's work. The pool of Bebras problems is agreed upon during the annual international "Bebras Task Workshop" by the representatives of all member countries.

History
Originally founded by the University of Vilnius and first administered in Lithuania in 2004, the Bebras competition is named after Lithuanian word "Bebras" which translates to "beaver". The competition has been subject of research and several dozen publications.

In 2015 the Bebras organization was awarded the Microsoft-sponsored "Best Practices in Education Award" by Informatics Europe. In 2019 Google awarded Bebras Indonesia a $1 million grant to support the program and further train teachers in the field of computer science.

By 2022, there were two and a half million global participants.

Bebras in the United Kingdom
The "Bebras Computing Challenge" is organized by the University of Oxford and backed by the Raspberry Pi Foundation in the United Kingdom and has more than 300,000 annual participants. Students with a score in the top 10% of their relative age group are invited to sit the Oxford University Computing Challenge.

References

External links
 Bebras International Challenge on Informatics and Computational Thinking

2004 establishments in Lithuania
Recurring events established in 2004
Computer science competitions
Computer science education
Awards and prizes of the University of Oxford
Vilnius University